Duck Lake (Nova Scotia) could mean  the following :

Cape Breton Regional Municipality
Duck Lake at

Colchester County

Duck Lake at

Digby County

Duck Lake at

Guysborough County

Duck Lake at

Halifax Regional Municipality

Duck Lake at 
Duck Lake at 
Duck Lake at 
Duck Lake at 
Duck Lake at 
Duck Lake at 
Duck Lake at 
Duck Lake at 
Duck Lake at 
Duck Lake at 
Duck Lake at 
Duck Lake at 
Duck Lake at

Pictou County

Duck Lake at

Region of Queens Municipality
Duck Lake at

Lunenburg County

Duck Lake at

Victoria County
Duck Lake at

Yarmouth County
Duck Lake at 
Duck Lake at 
Duck Lake at 
Duck Lakes  at

References
Geographical Names Board of Canada
Explore HRM
Nova Scotia Placenames

Lakes of Nova Scotia